The 2010 Pan American Youth Championship was the first edition of the Pan American Youth Championship, an international field hockey competition held from 13 – 20 March 2010 in Hermosillo, Mexico.

The tournament also served as a direct qualifier for the 2010 Summer Youth Olympics, with the winner qualifying.

Qualified teams

Results

Preliminary round

Pool A

Pool B

Classification round

Fifth to eighth place classification

Crossover

Seventh and eighth place

Fifth and sixth place

First to fourth place classification

Semi-finals

Third and fourth place

Final

Statistics

Final standings

References

Field hockey at the 2010 Summer Youth Olympics
International women's field hockey competitions hosted by Mexico
Pan American Youth Championship (girls' field hockey)